Rhianna Hannah Louise Kenny (born 1983) simply known as Rhianna, is an English R&B singer.

Early life
Born to David and Linda Kenny, Rhianna started her career as a backing vocalist for her brother LSK's band. She started her solo career in the 2000s.

Music

Solo career (2002–2005)
She signed a recording contract with Sony Music to record her debut album, Get On. She was initially successful in the UK and Ireland with her debut single "Oh Baby" reaching number 18 on the UK Singles Chart. However, her second single "Word Love" failed to reach the top 40 and the third, "I Love Every Little Thing About You," missed the top 75 altogether. When the album Get On also failed to reach the UK Albums Chart top 75, it effectively ended her solo career.

She has supported Beverley Knight on her 2003–2004 Who I Am UK tour and was the backing vocalist for trip hop act Faithless during their live performances in 2005.

Little Fix (2010–2012)

Rhianna is part of a duo named Little Fix. She and Bill Laurence, who is the co-founder of the duo, met on stage. They have recorded a number of songs, namely "Human Love", "Into Your Arms" and "No More Than Now". This duo should not be confused with the similarly named tribute band to Little Mix.

(2012–present)
She has sung backing vocals for artists such as Lianne La Havas, Faithless, Noisettes, Róisín Murphy, Bryan Ferry, Max Jury, John Newman, Years and Years and Robbie Williams.

Discography

Albums

Singles

References

External links
Rhianna on Myspace

1983 births
Living people
British contemporary R&B singers
English women pop singers
English women singer-songwriters
Singers from Leeds
21st-century English women singers
21st-century English singers